"Wasted" is a song by Australian electronic music duo Peking Duk. The song was released on 2 February 2018 and has peaked at number 66 on the Australian ARIA Singles Chart.

Peking Duk's Adam Hyne said: "We wrote this song around 3am in London town after drinking for quite some time. It started with the chords then Reubs laid down a bassline and we started riffing out on lyrics and vocal melodies. We couldn't help but sing out the vocal ideas in a hilarious 80s voice that made us scream laugh every time we'd throw an idea out there over the loud skeleton of a beat in the background. So then I yelled out the lyrics we had written and it sounded raw but really fun and genuine, which sums up this song. It's not trying to be anything special or grandiose, it's just a fun song and we had so much fun making it."

Track listing

Charts

Certifications

References

Peking Duk songs
2018 singles
2017 songs
Sony Music Australia singles